Carcassonne Airport is an airport serving Carcassonne and the south of Languedoc. The airport is located on the western edge of the city,  from the city center, in the Aude department of the Occitanie region in France. It is also known as Salvaza Airport, Carcassonne Salvaza Airport or Carcassonne Airport in Pays Cathare (Aéroport de Carcassonne en Pays Cathare). The airport handles commercial national and international flights as well as private, non-regular air traffic.

Air service history
In 1993, according to the Official Airline Guide (OAG) Carcassonne was served by Aigle Azur airlines with nonstop service to Paris Orly Airport operated with Saab 340 regional turboprop airliners. During the late 1990s, the airport was being served with budget flights to and from European airports, and by 2006 had regular flight connections with Dublin, London Stansted, Liverpool, East Midlands and Charleroi. In 2011, the airport served 368,000 passengers. 

Atlas Atlantique Airlines operated from the airport briefly to Oran in Algeria from 2016 to 2017; however, the airline ceased operations in late November 2017.

Ryanair is the only airline currently operating scheduled passenger service into the airport. It operates Boeing 737-800 jetliners on all of its flights.

Facilities
It has one paved runway designated, which measures . It can cater to aircraft operating under VFR.

Inside the terminal building there are two departure gates. A small shop is land-side in the terminal

A campus of the École nationale de l'aviation civile is also at the airport.

Airlines and destinations
The following airlines operate regular scheduled and charter flights at Carcassonne Airport:

Statistics

Ground transportation
There is a shuttle bus service from the airport to the centre of Carcassonne and Carcassonne Station, which runs to coincide with the arrivals of flights.

References

External links 
 Carcassonne Airport, 
 
 

Airports in Occitania (administrative region)
Salvaza
Buildings and structures in Aude